Susan Barker (born 1978) is a British novelist.

Personal life
She has an English father and a Chinese-Malaysian mother and grew up in East London. She studied at Leeds University and undertook the graduate writing programme at Manchester University. She writes primarily about Asia.

Career
Barker is the author of three novels: Sayonara Bar, which Time called "a cocktail of astringent cultural observations, genres stirred and shaken, subplots served with a twist", and The Orientalist and the Ghost, both published by Doubleday and longlisted for the Dylan Thomas Prize.

Her third novel The Incarnations is a 'stunning tale of a modern Beijing taxi driver being pursued by his soulmate across a thousand years of Chinese history' and was published by Doubleday in 2014.

Bibliography
Sayonara Bar, 2005
The Orientalist and the Ghost, 2008
The Incarnations, 2014

References

External links
Author's website
Interview with 3:AM
Interview with Authortrek
British Council profile

1978 births
Living people
British women novelists
21st-century British novelists
21st-century British women writers
People associated with Leeds Trinity University
English people of Chinese descent
English people of Malaysian descent